Manning was an electoral district of the Legislative Assembly in the Australian state of New South Wales from 1894 to 1904, and from 1988 to 1991 in the Manning River area.

Members for Manning

Election results

References

Former electoral districts of New South Wales
Constituencies established in 1894
1894 establishments in Australia
Constituencies disestablished in 1904
1904 disestablishments in Australia
Constituencies established in 1988
1988 establishments in Australia
Constituencies disestablished in 1991
1991 disestablishments in Australia